Chambers House, or Chambers Farmstead, or Chambers Farm, or Chambers Barn or variations, may refer to the following in the United States:

Chambers-Robinson House, Sheffield, Alabama, listed on the National Register of Historic Places (NRHP) in Colbert County, Alabama
Chambers Ranch, Colorado Springs, Colorado, listed on the National Register of Historic Places (NRHP) in El Paso County, Colorado
Chambers House (College Avenue, Newark, Delaware), listed on the NRHP in New Castle County, Delaware
Chambers House (Hopkins Bridge Road, Newark, Delaware), listed on the NRHP in New Castle County, Delaware
William Chambers House, Carnesville, Georgia, listed on the NRHP in Banks County, Georgia
Robert Chambers House, Burlington, Kentucky, listed on the NRHP in Boone County, Kentucky
A. E. Chambers Octagonal Barn, Petersburg, Kentucky, listed on the NRHP in Boone County, Kentucky
C. Scott Chambers House and Funeral Parlor, Walton, Kentucky, listed on the NRHP in Boone County, Kentucky
Whittaker Chambers Farm, Westminster, Maryland, NRHP-listed
John Chambers House, St. Ignace, Michigan, NRHP-listed
Maxwell Chambers House, Salisbury, North Carolina, listed on the NRHP in Rowan County, North Carolina
Chambers-Morgan Farm, White Store, North Carolina, listed on the NRHP in Anson County, North Carolina
Brigman-Chambers House, Weaverville, North Carolina, listed on the NRHP in Buncombe County, North Carolina
Matthew C. Chambers Barn, Albany, Oregon, listed on the NRHP in Linn County, Oregon
Frank L. and Ida H. Chambers House, Eugene, Oregon, NRHP-listed
Fred E. Chambers House and Grounds, Eugene, Oregon, NRHP-listed
Joseph and Virginia Chambers Farmstead, Newberg, Oregon, listed on the NRHP in Yamhill County, Oregon
C. E. Chambers House, Mitchell, South Dakota, listed on the NRHP in Davison County, South Dakota
Samuel A. Chambers House, Abilene, Texas, listed on the NRHP in Taylor County, Texas
Chambers House (Beaumont, Texas), a historic house museum of Texas
Hodges-Hardy-Chambers House, Wichita Falls, Texas, listed on the NRHP in Wichita County, Texas
Pearl and Eva Chambers House, Eau Claire, Wisconsin, listed on the NRHP in Eau Claire County, Wisconsin
Chambers-Markle Farmstead, La Crosse, Wisconsin, listed on the NRHP in La Crosse County, Wisconsin
Andy Chambers Ranch Historic District, Moose, Wyoming, NRHP-listed

See also
Chambers Building (disambiguation)